Tahir Tewfiq (also Tayer Tofiq) (1922–1987) was a popular Kurdish musician and singer.
He was born in the city of Koya around Arbil, in Iraqi Kurdistan. He began singing at an early age, according to himself when he was attending primary school.

Songs
Some popular songs of Tahir Tewfiq among dozens:
Dlaram - Asheqy chawi bazi xomem, boye haz la rawi kaw dakam
Kras zerdê
Shlêre wey Shlêre
Nesrîn ewro newroze
Torawe dilî min

External links
An interview with Tahir Tewfiq, by Radio Baghdad Kurdish section (in Kurdish)

1922 births
1987 deaths
People from Erbil Governorate
20th-century Iraqi male singers
Kurdish male singers